Oliver Tree Nickell (born June 29, 1993) is an American singer, record producer, and comedian. Born in Santa Cruz, California, Tree signed to Atlantic Records in 2017 after his song "When I'm Down" went viral and released his debut studio album Ugly Is Beautiful in 2020. He achieved international recognition with his songs "Life Goes On" in 2021, and "Miss You" in 2022. He released his second studio album Cowboy Tears on February 18, 2022.

Early life

Oliver Tree Nickell was born on June 29, 1993, in Santa Cruz, California. He has said he took "piano lessons at three years old, [began] songwriting the next year, and [had] an album written by age six."

Tree studied business at San Francisco State University for two years.

Career

2010–2016: Early career and hiatus 
Oliver launched his solo recording career as "Tree" in 2010. By then, he had made presentations for performances such as Skrillex and Zeds Dead. He initially self-released his music, releasing an album called "Splitting Branches" but signed with R&S Records in 2011. He sang and played guitar in a ska band called Irony, which was his first experience performing. Under the pseudonym Kryph, Tree produced dubstep for a brief period of time and performed at festivals such as Wobbleland 2011 in San Francisco. He performed shows opening for acts such as Tyler, the Creator, Nero, and Frank Ocean, and released music under his pseudonym, Tree.

At age 18, Tree signed up with London-based R&S Records and released his debut EP, Demons. The EP gained some recognition after Radiohead lead singer Thom Yorke approved of his cover of their song "Karma Police". Tree eventually found himself on hiatus as he went back to school, studying music technology at the California Institute of the Arts.

2016–2018: Return to music and Alien Boy 
In November 2016, he returned to music with his television debut, performing with Getter on Last Call with Carson Daly.

Shortly after the release of "When I'm Down", Tree signed to Atlantic Records, and a month later, graduated from the California Institute of the Arts.

Tree often writes, acts, and directs sketches in comedy videos, and has worked with companies such as Fuck Jerry.

In February 2018, Tree released his major-label debut EP, Alien Boy, along with the double music video for "All That x Alien Boy". Tree wrote and directed the debut, which took over nine months to create. He spent five months practicing freestyle monster truck jumping at the Perris Auto Speedway and performed all his stunts in the music video.

Oliver Tree has played major festivals such as Lollapalooza and Outside Lands Music and Arts Festival, and performed as a special guest at Coachella Valley Music and Arts Festival where he was subsequently named on LA Weeklys "The Best (and Weirdest) Fashion at Coachella" list in 2017.

He was the supporting act on Louis the Child's 2017 Last to Leave Tour (2017) and Skizzy Mars' Are You OK? Tour (2018), and was scheduled to join Lil Dicky and DJ Mustard on the Life Lessons Tour Fall 2018 before it was canceled.  Tree toured North America and Europe with Hobo Johnson in 2018.

2018–2020: Ugly Is Beautiful and singles 
Throughout 2018 and 2019, Tree released singles that would make an appearance on his debut album, Ugly Is Beautiful. On December 7, 2018, Tree released his second music video, "Hurt", a single from the album. He travelled to Ukraine to film the video, which he wrote and co-directed with Brendan Vaughan, an up-and-coming music video director. In the first week, the music video for "Hurt" reached one million views while the song received significant radio play.
On April 11, 2019, Tree released a standalone single, "Fuck", with the music video being released on the same day.

His fourth music video and single, "Miracle Man", was released on June 7, 2019, with the video reaching 1.3 million views on the first day of release. Tree released his second EP, Do You Feel Me? on August 2, 2019, to generally positive reviews.

On December 6, 2019, Tree released "Cash Machine", a single accompanied by a music video. Together with the single, Tree announced his debut album, Ugly Is Beautiful, and announced that the album would be released on March 27, 2020. On March 25, 2020, Tree posted a message to his Twitter page, stating that due to the COVID-19 pandemic, Ugly Is Beautiful would not be released on time. However, on May 19, the album's official release date was revealed to be June 12.

On May 16, 2020, Tree set the Guinness World Record for the world's largest kick scooter, which he later uploaded a video of himself riding on July 17, 2020.

On June 8, 2020, Tree announced his decision to delay Ugly Is Beautiful yet again, this time to July 17. He stated that, because of the issues of racism and police violence against black people going on during that time after the murder of George Floyd, he "did not believe it was an appropriate time" to release the album when "much bigger things" deserved attention. On July 17, 2020, Ugly Is Beautiful was released.

2021–present: Deluxe version of Ugly Is Beautiful and Cowboy Tears 
Despite claiming that he was retired, he released the single "Out of Ordinary" on February 4, 2021, announcing the deluxe edition of Ugly Is Beautiful.

On May 28, 2021, Tree released a deluxe version of his debut album named Ugly Is Beautiful: Shorter, Thicker & Uglier.

He would later collaborate with Russian rave band Little Big and release the single "Turn It Up", featuring Tommy Cash, from their collaborative EP Welcome to the Internet, which was later released on September 30, 2021.

On January 12, 2022, Tree released the single "Cowboys Don't Cry" from his second album Cowboy Tears. Cowboy Tears was released on February 18, 2022. On May 20, 2022, Tree released a single, "I Hate You" along with "Cowboys Don't Cry". He would also announced a tour to accompany the album Cowboy Tears. Oliver would follow up the release of Cowboy Tears with a deluxe titled "Cowboy Tears: Drown the World in a Swimming Pool of Sorrow (Deluxe) in late December.  

On March 3, 2023 Oliver released his first single of 2023 "Here We Go Again" with producer David Guetta.

Discography

Studio albums

Independent albums

Extended plays

Singles

As lead artist

As featured artist

Awards and nominations

Notes

References

External links 
 
 

1993 births
Living people
People from Santa Cruz, California
Musicians from Santa Cruz, California
American alternative rock musicians
American dance musicians
Singers from California
Comedians from California
American sketch comedians
Dance-pop musicians
San Francisco State University alumni
21st-century American singers
21st-century American comedians
21st-century American rappers
21st-century American male singers